Jim Diamond is Singer/Songwriter Jim Diamond's self-titled and third studio album. Diamond was assisted by old friends Graham Lyle and Chris Parren, who had worked with him on previous albums.

The album featured tracks like "Broadway" (which was released as a single), "Could Have Fooled Me" and "Second Chance". "The Last Time" was also released as a single ("Miracles" was the B-Side.)

At least two tracks features Diamond's PhD partner Tony Hymas on keyboards, their first together since their split in 1983 and last until 2006.  "With You I Feel Like" and "Drive Time" would be re-recorded for their 2009 comeback Three.

The album is currently out of print.

Track listing
"The Last Time"  3:51
"Second Chance"  4:37
"The Word"  3:57
"With You I Feel Like"  5:17
"Could Have Fooled Me"  3:23
"Broadway"  4:15
"I Still Turn to You"  4:06
"Drive Time"  4:32
"Miracles"  3:15

1988 albums
Jim Diamond (singer) albums
Albums produced by Phil Manzanera